The Ohio Valley Electric Railway was a street railway and interurban system that ran between Huntington, West Virginia, and Ashland, Kentucky.  The system was also connected by ferry to Ironton, Ohio.

History

The Ohio Valley Electric Railway was incorporated in West Virginia on August 28, 1899, and, backed by Senator Johnson N. Camden, bought out the Consolidated Light and Railway Company of Huntington, the Ashland and Catlettsburg Street Railway, and the Ironton and Petersburg Street Railway. By the fall of 1900, new track connected the West Virginia and Kentucky segments of the line, and the combined properties became known as the Camden Interstate Railway Company.

In 1908, the company changed its name back to the Ohio Valley Electric Railway. Street railway operations ceased in 1937.

References

External links
 HuntingtonTrolley.com
 KentuckyExplorer.com
 ElectricalRailroaders.org
 LawrenceCountyOhio.com
 Camden Park history

Huntington, West Virginia
Transportation in Cabell County, West Virginia
Transportation in Wayne County, West Virginia
Ashland, Kentucky
Transportation in Boyd County, Kentucky
Transportation in Lawrence County, Ohio
Streetcars in West Virginia
Streetcars in Kentucky
Streetcars in Ohio
Interurban railways in West Virginia
Interurban railways in Kentucky
Interurban railways in Ohio
Defunct Kentucky railroads
Defunct Ohio railroads
Defunct West Virginia railroads